Keroplatus testaceus is a species of fungus gnats belonging to the family Keroplatidae.

It is native to Eurasia. Hans-Jürgen Stammer discovered that the larvae and pupae are bioluminescent, and attributed the light production to the fat body.

References

Keroplatidae
Insects described in 1818